G&R London is an independent record label based in London, England which was established in 2007. The label was set up by Cockney Rejects guitarist Mick Geggus and the original East End Badoes bassist Andy Russell, with the intention of recording and promoting new material from established and newer bands. The first album to be released on the label was Unforgiven by Cockney Rejects on 15 May 2007.

Bands
The 4-Skins
Bad Manners
The Business
Cockney Rejects
The East End Badoes
The Gonads
The Masons
The Orgasm Guerillas
The Postmen
Rancid
Red Alert
The Secret Members
Trebek
The Usual Suspects

See also
List of record labels

References

External links
G&R London website

Punk record labels
British independent record labels
2007 in London
2007 establishments in England